Anthony Francis Piet, born Anthony Francis Pietruszka (December 7, 1906 – December 1, 1981) was an infielder in Major League Baseball from 1931 to 1938. He played for the Pittsburgh Pirates, Cincinnati Reds, Chicago White Sox, and Detroit Tigers. He truncated his surname to Piet because Pietruszka couldn't fit on the Forbes Field scoreboard.

An all-around player, Piet was second in the National League in stolen bases (19) in 1932, and played the most games (154) of any player in the NL that year. In 1933, his batting average (.323) was the third highest in the NL. After retiring from baseball, he went on to found a car dealership in Chicago, whose slogan was "Shop for it anywhere, you'll buy it at Piet".

In 744 games, Piet batted .277 (717-2585) with 352 runs, 23 home runs and 312 RBI in an eight-year major league career.

Piet died of a heart ailment at age 74 at Hinsdale Sanitarium and Hospital in Hinsdale, Illinois on December 1, 1981.

References

External links

1906 births
1981 deaths
American people of Polish descent
Baseball players from Pennsylvania
Chicago White Sox players
Cincinnati Reds players
Detroit Tigers players
Major League Baseball infielders
Pittsburgh Pirates players